Buhl is an unincorporated community in Tuscaloosa County, Alabama, United States, located  west-northwest of Tuscaloosa. Buhl has a post office with ZIP code 35446. The community is home to Buhl Elementary School, which is part of the Tuscaloosa County School System. Buhl is named for a Mr. Buhl, who was an employee of the Mobile and Ohio Railroad.

See also
Unincorporated communities in Alabama

References

Unincorporated communities in Tuscaloosa County, Alabama
Unincorporated communities in Alabama